Omm ol Khassa-ye Vosta (also Romanized as Omm ol Khas̄s̄á-ye Vostá and Omm ol Khes̄s̄á-ye Vostá; also known as Omm Khos̄ī, Omm Khos̄ī-ye Vosţá, Omm Khos̄nī, Omm ol Khashá Vosţa, Omm ol Khashā-ye Vosţa, and Omm ol Khes̄ey-ye Mīānī) is a village in Abdoliyeh-ye Gharbi Rural District, in the Central District of Ramshir County, Khuzestan Province, Iran. At the 2006 census, its population was 56, in 10 families.

References 

Populated places in Ramshir County